Paniai Regency is one of the regencies (kabupaten) in Central Papua Province of Indonesia. It is named after the Paniai Lakes. It covers an area of 6,525.25 km2, and had a population of 153,432 at the 2010 Census and 220,410 at the 2020 Census. The administrative centre is Enarotali, in East Paniai.

Administrative districts
At the 2010 Census, Paniai Regency comprised ten districts (distrik). However, by 2018 the splitting of existing districts to create additional ones had raised the total to twenty-four districts. These are tabulated below with their areas and their populations at the 2010 census and 2020 Census. The table also includes the location of the district administrative centres.

Note (a) The fourteen new districts created since 2013 are: Aweida, Baya Biru, Deiyai Miyo, Dogomo, Fajar Timur (East Fajar), Muye, Nakama, Pugo Dagi, Teluk Deya (Deya Bay), Topiyai, Wege Bino, Wege Muka, Yagai and Youtadi. Their areas and populations as at 2010 are included with the figures for the original districts from which they were cut out subsequently.

References

External links
Statistics publications from Statistics Indonesia (BPS)

Regencies of Central Papua